Ruby Blue may refer to:

Ruby Blue, a UK folk rock/pop band of the late 1980s and early 1990s
Ruby Blue (album), the debut solo album of Irish singer Róisín Murphy
Ruby Blue, A song from the album
Ruby Blue (jazz), a four-person jazz group from San Diego, California
Ruby Blue (film), a British film made in 2007 starring Bob Hoskins